New Writings in SF 5 is an anthology of science fiction short stories edited by John Carnell, the fifth volume in a series of thirty, of which he edited the first twenty-one. It was first published in hardcover by Dennis Dobson in 1965, followed by a paperback edition by Corgi in 1966, and an American paperback edition by Bantam Books in August 1970.

The book collects seven novelettes and short stories by various science fiction authors, with a foreword by Carnell.

Contents
"Foreword" (John Carnell)
"Potential" (Donald Malcolm)
"The Liberators" (Lee Harding)
"Takeover Bid" (John Baxter)
"Acclimatization" (David Stringer)
"The Expanding Man" (R. W. Mackelworth)
"Treasure Hunt" (Joseph Green)
"Sunout" (Eric C. Williams)

External links

1965 anthologies
05
1960s science fiction works